"You're All I Need to Get By" is a song recorded by the American R&B/soul duo Marvin Gaye and Tammi Terrell and released on Motown Records' Tamla label in 1968. It was the basis for the 1995 single "I'll Be There for You/You're All I Need to Get By" from Method Man and Mary J. Blige.

Overview
Written by Nickolas Ashford & Valerie Simpson, it became one of the few Motown recordings of the 1960s that was not recorded with the familiar "Motown sound". Instead, "You're All I Need to Get By" had a more soulful and gospel-oriented theme surrounding it, that was influenced by the writers, who also sing background vocals on the recording, sharing vocals in a church choir in New York City. Marvin and Tammi recorded the song at Hitsville. Ashford & Simpson later stated how the session was hard as Terrell was recovering from surgery on the malignant brain tumor that ultimately caused her death less than two years after they recorded the song.

During moments in the recording, Gaye can be heard encouraging Terrell to sing her verses, ad-libbing come on Tammi several times. A year later, Gaye was performing this song with Stax vocalist Carla Thomas at the Apollo Theater, when Terrell, who was seated in the front row in her wheelchair, began singing along, prompting Gaye to leave the stage and sing the song with Terrell, who was offered a microphone. It was Terrell's final performance before her death in March 1970. The song was played during Terrell's funeral while Gaye gave a brief, tearful eulogy.

The original recording by Gaye and Terrell peaked at number seven on the Billboard Hot 100 and number-one on Billboard's Hot R&B/Soul Singles chart for five weeks, becoming one of the longest-running number one R&B hits of 1968 and the most successful duet recording of Marvin Gaye's career. It reached #19 on the British singles charts in late 1968, staying there for 19 weeks.

Billboard described the single as a "driving rhythm follow-up" to the duo's previous hit single "Ain't Nothing Like the Real Thing" which "will hit hard and fast."  Cash Box called it a "tremendous ballad with a hearty beat," saying that the "scintillating opening excites listener response with an impending explosion that develops slowly unfolding solid performance."

Personnel
 All lead vocals by Marvin Gaye and Tammi Terrell
 Background vocals by Ashford & Simpson
 Produced by Ashford & Simpson
 Instrumentation by The Funk Brothers

Chart history

Weekly charts

Year-end charts

Johnny Mathis and Deniece Williams version

Johnny Mathis and Deniece Williams recorded "You're All I Need to Get By" for their 1978 duet album That's What Friends Are For.  It was the follow-up to their U.S. number-one hit, "Too Much, Too Little, Too Late".

Their version of "You're All I Need to Get By" peaked at #47 on the Billboard Hot 100, #10 on the Hot Soul Singles Chart, #16 on the Adult Contemporary chart, and #45 on the UK Singles Chart. It did best on the Canadian Adult Contemporary chart, where it reached #5.

Chart history

Weekly charts

Notable cover versions
 Aretha Franklin recorded the song as a single in 1971 (Atlantic 45-2787).  The song was also included on her compilation album Aretha's Greatest Hits which was released later the same year.  Her version peaked at #19 on the Billboard Hot 100 and #3 on the Hot Soul Singles chart. It also features in a 2020 holiday advertisement for Walmart.
 Tony Orlando & Dawn's version became the third to reach the U.S. Top 40, peaking at #34 in 1975.  They also reached #13 on the Adult Contemporary chart.
 Kathy Troccoli recorded her version on her debut album Stubborn Love in 1982. The lyrics had minor changes to make it fit into the CCM genre.
The song was covered in the 2021 film CODA, which tells the story of the hearing child of deaf parents who discovers her own singing abilities. The song was performed as a duet by Emilia Jones and Ferdia Walsh-Peelo several times throughout the film.

References

External links
 List of cover versions of "You're All I Need to Get By" at SecondHandSongs.com

1967 songs
1968 singles
Marvin Gaye songs
Tammi Terrell songs
Aretha Franklin songs
Songs written by Nickolas Ashford
Songs written by Valerie Simpson
Male–female vocal duets
Tony Orlando songs
Johnny Mathis songs
Deniece Williams songs
The Angels (American group) songs
Song recordings produced by Ashford & Simpson
Tamla Records singles
Columbia Records singles